Neuroblastoma breakpoint family member 19, or NBPF19, is a protein that in humans is encoded by the NBPF19 gene. This protein is included in the neuroblastoma breakpoint family of proteins.

Gene 
The NBPF19 gene is a protein-encoding gene in humans. It is composed of 80,464 bases including all introns and exons. It is located on the positive strand of chromosome 1 at locus 1q21.2.

Expression 
EST profiling of NBPF19 shows it to be ubiquitously expressed in most human tissues at unremarkable amounts. It is expressed in relatively higher amounts in the skin, lymphoid organs (lymph nodes, spleen) and the gonads (ovary, testes).

Transcript 
The mRNA transcript of NBPF19 in humans is 13,190 bases long. There are 2 predicted alternative splicing isoforms, although none have been experimentally observed.

Protein 
The protein product of the NBPF19 transcript is composed of 3,843 amino acids and weights 440.5 kD. It contains 45 DUF1220 domains of unknown function but that have been linked to evolutionary changes and generally decrease in number in species increasingly evolutionarily distant from humans.

Structure 
NBPF19 is expected to undergo many post-translational modifications, most notably phosphorylation and sumoylation. The protein is extensively phosphorylated on serine, threonine and tyrosine residues in a repetitive pattern seen in the figure to the left. There are 14 predicted repeats within the protein sequence likely to be sites of sumoylation.

The tertiary structure of NBPF19  is predicted to be roughly 50% coiled-coil and 40% alpha helical. There is no presence of a signal peptide or any transmembrane domains. NBPF19 is likely localized to the nucleus due to the presence of a nuclear localization signal near its 5' terminus.

Homology 
NBPF19 is one of 26 identified members of the neuroblastoma breakpoint family of proteins in humans. Sequence similarity among these proteins is largely limited to conservation of DUF1220 domains. The most highly-similar paralogs are listed below:

NBPF19 is not well conserved outside of humans and any notable conservation does not extend past primates and mammals. Select species possess short sequences of similarity and are listed below:

 Pan troglodytes (common chimpanzee)
 Pongo abelii (Sumatran orangutan)
 Piliocolobus tephrosceles (Ugandan red colobus)
 Bos taurus (cow)
 Felis catus (cat)
 Camelus ferus (Bactrian camel)
 Sus scrofa (wild boar)
 Equus asinus (donkey)

References

Further reading